Reagan is an unincorporated community in Johnston County, Oklahoma, United States. A post office operated in Reagan from 1894 to 1931. The town was named after John Henninger Reagan who was Postmaster General of the Confederate States of America.

Demographics

References

Unincorporated communities in Johnston County, Oklahoma
Unincorporated communities in Oklahoma